Mizban Khadr al-Hadi was a general and politician in Ba'athist Iraq. He served as a member of the Revolutionary Command Council from 1991 to 2001.

Biography
Hadi was born in 1938 in Mandali District, in what is now Diyala Governorate. Hadi was extremely close to Saddam Hussein, serving as a key advisor since the early 1980s, particularly on Shiite affairs. He was made a Minister without portfolio in June 1982, and before that served as Governor of Najaf.

Hadi was decorated by Saddam Hussein for his role in both the Gulf War and the subsequent 1991 uprisings in Iraq. Due to his close links to Saddam Hussein, Hadi was elevated in March 2003 to command the central Euphrates region; one of Iraq's four military regions during the 2003 invasion of Iraq. Hadi was no. 23 on the Iraqi playing cards.

Hadi was reported to have had been arrested by US Forces in Baghdad on 1 May 2003. CENTCOM later claimed that Hadi was arrested on 8 July 2003 after turning himself in to Coalition forces in Baghdad.

Hadi died on 16 May 2020, due to a terminal illness in Nasiriyah Central Prison.

References 

1938 births
2020 deaths
Arab Socialist Ba'ath Party – Iraq Region politicians
Governors of Najaf Governorate
Prisoners and detainees of the United States military
Prisoners who died in Iraqi detention
Iraqi Shia Muslims
Most-wanted Iraqi playing cards
Iraq War prisoners of war
Iraqi prisoners of war
Iraqi people who died in prison custody